All Saints Church is in the village of Long Whatton, Leicestershire, England.  It is an active Anglican parish church in the deanery of Akeley East, the archdeaconry of Loughborough, and the diocese of Leicester.  The church is recorded in the National Heritage List for England as a designated Grade II* listed building.  It dates mainly from the 14th century, with a tower dating from the late 12th or early 13th century, and its upper stage added in the 15th or 16th century.  The church was partly rebuilt in 1865–66.  In 1931 the Lancaster architect Henry Paley of Austin and Paley added a baptistry as a memorial to Lord Crawshaw.

See also
List of ecclesiastical works by Austin and Paley (1916–44)

References

Church of England church buildings in Leicestershire
Diocese of Leicester
Austin and Paley buildings